Omololu Samuel Meroyi was elected Senator for the Ondo South constituency of Ondo State, Nigeria at the start of the Nigerian Fourth Republic, running on the Alliance for Democracy (AD) platform. He took office on 29 May 1999.

Meroyi attended the Ijebu Ode Grammar School and the University of Ibadan, where he earned a BSc. in Economics in 1973. 
He went the London School of Economics where he gained an MSc in Economics in 1977.

He worked with Food Specialities Nigeria (1978–1980), Roro Technical Company (1980–1982) and was chairman of Araromi Rubber Estate (1995–1997).

During the Nigerian Second Republic he was elected into the House of Representatives on the Unity Party of Nigeria (UPN) platform.

Elected to the Senate in 1999 on the AD platform, Meroye later decamped to the People's Democratic Party (PDP).
In December 2002 Meroyi was a contender to become the PDP candidate for Ondo State Governor in the 2003 elections, but lost to the former Minister of Power and Steel, Dr. Olusegun Agagu, winning only seven out of 161 votes.
In May 2003 the Senate rejected President Olusegun Obasanjo's veto of the Independent Corrupt Practices and Other Related Offences Commission Act, and passed the bill into law. Meroyi voted against the Senate decision.

After leaving the Senate, Meroyi became a board member of Wema Bank Plc. from January 2004 until his resignation in 2007.
In March 2008 the managing director of the bank was arrested by the Special Fraud Unit of the Police in Ikoyi, Lagos concerning a N450 million scam, but was granted bail.
Meroyi was alleged to have received a payout of N4 million, and was questioned by the police.

Meroyi left the PDP and became Ondo South Senatorial District Chairman of the Labour Party. 
In April 2008 he testified at Elections Petitions Tribunal hearings into the April 2007 governorship election in Ondo State, which were marred by irregularities.  The tribunal decided that Dr. Olusegun Mimiko of the Labour Party was the elected governor.
In 2011, he became a board director of Lagos Airport Hotel. He later resigned his appointment a year later after he rejoined the Peoples Democratic Party (PDP). He is now the National Vice Chairman (South-West) Nigerian Senators' Forum.

References

Members of the Senate (Nigeria)
Living people
Yoruba politicians
People from Ondo State
University of Ibadan alumni
Alumni of the London School of Economics
Alliance for Democracy (Nigeria) politicians
Peoples Democratic Party (Nigeria) politicians
Labour Party (Nigeria) politicians
Ijebu Ode Grammar School alumni
20th-century Nigerian politicians
21st-century Nigerian politicians
Year of birth missing (living people)